Mauro Miraglia (born 4 October 1997) is an Argentine professional footballer who plays as a midfielder for Comunicaciones.

Career
Miraglia's career began in the ranks of Comunicaciones. He began featuring for the club in the second part of 2016–17, making his debut in a 2–1 win over Acassuso on 11 March 2017; he was substituted on in place of Federico Barrionuevo. Further appearances versus Colegiales, San Telmo and Atlanta arrived that season in Primera B Metropolitana. In 2017–18, Miraglia scored goals against Acassuso and San Telmo; as well as against Platense.

Career statistics
.

References

External links

1997 births
Living people
Footballers from Buenos Aires
Argentine footballers
Association football midfielders
Primera B Metropolitana players
Club Comunicaciones footballers